Quentin Fillon Maillet (born 16 August 1992) is a French biathlete. He is the Olympic champion in the 20 km individual and the 12.5 km pursuit at the 2022 Beijing Games. He is the first French athlete and the first biathlete to win five medals in a single edition of the Winter Games. He is the winner of the 2021–22 Biathlon World Cup.

Biathlon results
All results are sourced from the International Biathlon Union.

Olympic Games
5 medals (2 gold, 3 silver)

World Championships
12 medals (3 gold, 4 silver, 5 bronze)

*The single mixed relay was added as an event in 2019.

World Cup
World Cup rankings

Individual victories
16 victories (1 In, 4 Sp, 9 Pu, 2 MS); victories at Winter Olympics are not counted as World Cup victories but are listed here. 

Relay victories
11 victories

Podiums
(World Cup + World Championships + Olympic Games)

(Statistics as of 20 March 2022.)

Junior World Championships

References

External links
 

1992 births
Living people
French male biathletes
Biathlon World Championships medalists
Biathletes at the 2018 Winter Olympics
Biathletes at the 2022 Winter Olympics
Medalists at the 2022 Winter Olympics
Olympic biathletes of France
Olympic gold medalists for France
Olympic silver medalists for France
Olympic medalists in biathlon
Sportspeople from Jura (department)